Yves M. LeGal is a French and Canadian judoka and retired professor of surgery who is considered the 'Father of Judo in Newfoundland and Labrador' for his work in developing and promoting judo in the province after moving there in 1968. He was Director of University Judo for Judo Canada, coached the Canadian University Judo Team, founded and served as President of the Newfoundland and Labrador Judo Association, and was inducted into the Sport Newfoundland and Labrador Hall of Fame in 1990 and the Judo Canada Hall of Fame in 2003. He also played a major role in the development of judo in Saskatchewan, serving as the chief instructor at six clubs and training 22 students to shodan (1st dan) in the province from 1953-1968. Since retirement from Memorial University LeGal has moved to Vancouver Island and serves as an instructor at the Nanaimo Judo Club.

Selected publications

Further reading

See also 
 Judo in Canada
 List of Canadian judoka

References 

Canadian male judoka
Living people
Year of birth missing (living people)